Rainwave is an interactive radio website that allows users to request, rate, and vote for songs in real time. The site hosts five separate radio streams and focuses completely on video game music. Rainwave is a free service, funded primarily by Robert "LiquidRain" McAuley, and supplemented by user donations.

History
The Rainwave web interface and back-end was written by Robert McAuley. The initial version was called "Raincast" and was written as a stream helper for IceS. It was announced to the Icecast mailing list in November 2004.

In the summer of 2008, with the addition of a second stream for OCR Radio, Rainwave became the official online radio station for OverClocked ReMix. At the same time, the Rainwave interface was upgraded to version 2, or "R2".

In March 2009, a third stream, V-wave, was added to the site. V-wave specializes in video game music covers and chiptunes. For a brief period, V-wave featured live radio shows as well.

In February 2011, V-wave was renamed to Mixwave and then eventually Covers.

Later that year, in August 2011, 2 new stations were introduced. The first was named Omniwave, which hosted all music available on via the website. The second was Bitwave, a stream exclusively for chiptune music. From this point on, Rainwave also started to present its music streams in MP3 format.

Technical Functionality
Rainwave interface and server-side software has been designed and implemented by Robert "LiquidRain" McAuley.

It is divided into various layers with different functionality:
 Lyre: JSON API written in Python using Tornado.
 Orpheus: custom-made software C++ app made to control Rainwave (incl. elections, song selections, request processing, etc.)
 Eurydice: custom-made web app paneling system used for the site.
 LiquidSoap: third-party software for audio streaming.

Audio streams are in the Vorbis and mp3 formats at approximately 96 kbit/s.

See also

 List of online music databases
 Streaming media

References

External links
 
 Github Page
 Crispy Gamer

Internet radio
Internet radio stations in the United States